Joseph Gallo may refer to:

Joseph Edward Gallo (1919–2007), cheese producer, brother of winemakers Ernest and Julio Gallo
Joseph N. Gallo (1912–1995), American gangster, consigliere of the Gambino crime family
Joe Gallo (1929–1972), also known as "Crazy Joe", American gangster, captain in the Colombo crime family
Joe Gallo (basketball) (born 1980), American basketball coach
Joey Gallo (born 1993), baseball player